Hum Pyar Tumhi Se Kar Baithe is a 2002 Indian Hindi-language film directed by Mohan Singh Rathor and produced by Ratan Jain. It stars Jugal Hansraj and Tina Rana in pivotal roles.

Cast
 Jugal Hansraj...Vishwas
 Tina Rana...Priya
 Sachin Khedekar...Vikas
Anoop Soni
Vishnu Sharma
 Mushtaq Khan...Bharoselal
 Johny Lever...Pyare
 Dinesh Hingoo...Havaldar Dharti Dhakel Singh
 Viju Khote...Shopkeeper in Mount Abu
 Navni Parihar...Mamta
 Jeet Upendra

Soundtrack

References

External links

2000s Hindi-language films
2002 films